The RFB X-113 Aerofoil Boat was an experimental ground effect vehicle intended to work over water.  It was one of three such aircraft designed by Alexander Lippisch in the 1960s and early 1970s. The X-113 first flew in 1970; only one was built.

Design and development

Lippisch's development of his Aerofoil Boat, a ground effect vehicle for use over water, began whilst he was working in the aviation division of the Collins Radio Company in Cedar Rapids, Iowa, US. The first test of concept was the Collins X-112, flown in the mid-1960s.  In 1967 development was continued in collaboration with Rhein-Flugzeugbau (RFB) in Germany, funded by the German government. This resulted in the X-113.

The X-113 was an inverse delta aircraft; that is, it had a wing which was triangular in plan but with a straight, unswept leading edge. Combined with strong anhedral, this layout produces stable flight in ground effect. Specifically, it is claimed that it is stable in pitch and also that it can fly in ground effect at altitudes up to about 50% of its span, allowing it to operate over rough water.  This contrasts with the lower aspect ratio square wing of the Ekranoplans which leaves ground effect at only 10% of span, limiting them to the calmer waters of lakes and rivers.

The Aerofoil Boat was built using glassfibre sandwiches with foam or tube cores.  Its wing was set high on the fuselage, with swept fins at the tips inclined at about 60°, carrying short ailerons.  The tips also carried long, wide planing floats which projected a long way forward of the leading edge to support the fuselage stably above the surface when on water.  Forward of the wings the fuselage was flat sided and quite shallow, so the pilot was semi-recumbent under a long canopy. Aft, a long dorsal fin extends to a  T tail with rudder and horizontal stabiliser.

The engine was mounted uncowled over the fuselage near mid-chord on a pylon constructed from three pairs of narrow angle V-struts.

The first flight was made in October 1970 on Lake Constance and the initial tests to explore the performance of the Aerofoil Boat were also done there.  These were deemed satisfactory and later flights over the North Sea showed that it could be operated over rough water. It also demonstrated its ability to fly out of ground effect, reaching at least .  Flight tests continued at least until 1974 and possibly later.  The X-113 was displayed in public at the Paris Salon in May 1973.

Specifications (X-113 Am)

Video
"The aerofoil Boat", Lippisch research Corporation (https://www.youtube.com/watch?v=gnflnBF7jWk)

References

Patent US3190582, 1965

Ground effect vehicles
RFB aircraft
1970s German experimental aircraft
Single-engined tractor aircraft
High-wing aircraft
Aircraft first flown in 1970
T-tail aircraft